Harry's War may refer to:

 Harry's War (1981 film), American independent film
 Harry's War (1999 film), Australian short film

See also
 The Secret War of Harry Frigg, 1968 comedy film set in World War II